Bora Dağtekin (born 27 October 1978) is a German screenwriter and film director who has directed several of the most successful German-language films, notably Fack ju Göhte.

Early life
Dağtekin was born and raised in Hanover to a German mother and a Turkish father and moved to Ludwigsburg to study screenwriting at the Film Academy Baden-Württemberg, graduating in 2006. His thesis screenplay was an retelling of the classic German play The Robbers as an action film.

Career
Dağtekin worked as a writer in the advertising industry before finding employment as a writer for various German television series, among them the soap opera Gute Zeiten, schlechte Zeiten. His directorial debut was Türkisch für Anfänger (2006–2009); he also wrote and directed a feature-length film with the same name in 2012.

His biggest success was the 2013 film Fack ju Göhte, which was the fourth-most successful German film ever as measured by audience numbers and spawned a movie franchise with two sequels as well as a musical.

Personal life
Dağtekin is known to keep his private life out of the public eye. He has stated in interviews that his films are unapologetically commercial rather than artistic and that this is a reflection of his personal taste, as he does not enjoy the more experimental style of art films.

Filmography

Film

Writer

Awards 
2006: Deutscher Fernsehpreis (Türkisch für Anfänger for best series)
2007: Adolf-Grimme-Preis
2007: Civis Media Prize
2008: BANFF World Television Award
2008: Deutscher Fernsehpreis (Doctor's Diary as the best series)
2008: Deutscher Comedypreis (Doctor's Diary as the best comedy-series)
2009: Adolf-Grimme-Preis (Doctor's Diary)
2009: Bayerischer Fernsehpreis (Doctor's Diary)
2009: Winner TV Festival Monte Carlo (Türkisch für Anfänger)

References

External links
 

1978 births
German people of Turkish descent
Living people
Film people from Hanover
German male writers